Tuguegarao City Science High School (TCSHS) has a specialized system of public secondary schools in the Philippines. It is operated and supervised by the Department of Education, with a curriculum heavily focusing on math and science.

The TCSHS system offers scholarships to Tuguegarao's students who are gifted in the sciences and mathematics. Admission is by competitive examination only. Graduates of the TCSHS are advised to major in the pure and applied sciences, mathematics, or engineering in college.

In the years since its creation, TCSHS has developed a worldwide reputation as one of the best high schools in the region, public or private. It attracts an intellectually gifted blend of culturally, ethnically, and economically diverse students.

Remaining true to its goals, TCSHS, with a growing population of 762 students, has been a leader in the realm of quality education since 2008. And as its motto — Scientia ad Veritatem upholds, TCSHS continues and will continue to be the Division of Tuguegarao City's touchstone of knowledge and truth.

History
Tuguegarao City Science High School was founded by the former mayor of Tuguegarao City, Delfin Telan Ting.

The inception of TCSHS was made possible by Resolution No. 091-2006. City Councilors Eliseo B. Ave, Corona C. Borja, Michael Ting and Bonifacio Quilang sponsored the resolution that would eventually see the creation of the Tuguegarao City Division's Science High School. The Sangguniang Panlungsod headed by Vice-Mayor Arnel Arugay and Mayor Randolph Ting unanimously approved the resolution. 

On July 27, 2007, Department of Education (DepEd) Regional Director Jesus Taberdo approved the request; thus, Tuguegarao City saw the institution of TCSHS by virtue of DepEd Order No. 49, S. 2003 and DepEd Order No. 69, S. 1993. The department orders provide that there shall be one region/division science high school for each region/division for highly gifted students who are inclined towards science. After all the rigors of its establishment, TCSHS started its operation on June 10, 2008 at the City's old municipal hall along Mabini Street with a population of 90 able scholars.

TCSHS separates its students by sections based on the scores obtained at the entrance examination. In 2008-2009, there was no entrance examination for its pioneering batch. The students in the school year 2008-2009 are actually passers of Philippine Science High School including first screening passers. For the second year afterwards, students are sorted by the general average they attained for the fourth grading period. As of school year 2012-2013, the K-12 curriculum was introduced to this school by adding two extra years to the basic education curriculum. The school only offers the Academic track specifically, the Science, Technology, Engineering, and Mathematics Strand. Starting on the school year 2018-2019, heterogenous sectioning for all grade levels are implemented.

Administration
The current administration is headed by Mrs. Rosechelle M. Cauilan.

Application 
The only way to be accepted is to pass its entrance exam. Philippine Science High School passers are eligible to enroll here automatically.

References

Schools in Cagayan
Education in Tuguegarao
Science high schools in the Philippines